{{DISPLAYTITLE:Xi2 Ceti}}

 

Xi2 Ceti, Latinized from ξ2 Ceti, is a star located in the equatorial constellation of Cetus. It is visible to the naked eye with an apparent visual magnitude of +4.3. This star is located at a distance of approximately 197 light years from the Sun based on parallax, and is drifting further away with a radial velocity of 12 km/s.

Xi2 Ceti is a spectrophotometric standard star. It displays a stellar classification of B9.5III, which suggests it has exhausted its core hydrogen, evolved away from the main sequence, and expanded to become a giant star, although still only 127 million years old. It has 2.45 times the mass and 2.6 times the radius of the Sun.

Consequently, the Chinese name for Xi2 Ceti itself is "the Sixth Star of Circular Celestial Granary", .

References

External links

http://server3.wikisky.org/starview?object_type=1&object_id=889
http://www.alcyone.de/cgi-bin/search.pl?object=HR0718 

Cetus, Xi2
Cetus (constellation)
Cetus, Xi2
Durchmusterung objects
Ceti, 73
015318
011484
0718